General Guido is a town in Buenos Aires Province, Argentina. It is the administrative headquarters for General Guido Partido.

External links

Populated places in Buenos Aires Province